Liisa Lepola (born 8 February 1998) is a Finnish aesthetic group gymnast.

She's a two-time (2015, 2016) Finnish National champion in Aesthetic group gymnastics competing with Team Minetit.

References 

Living people
1998 births
Finnish gymnasts
Sportspeople from Helsinki